

175001–175100 

|-id=017
| 175017 Záboří ||  || The village of Záboří, Czech Republic, was first mentioned in 1263, and is known for its traditional South Bohemian Rustic Baroque architecture style || 
|-id=046
| 175046 Corporon ||  || Serge Corporon (born 1948), French electronics engineer, who works with the discoverer in constructing a very sensitive CCD camera for the Meudon Observatory || 
|}

175101–175200 

|-id=109
| 175109 Sharickaer ||  || Sharvel Gretzner (born 1986), American veterinarian assistant, and Rick Kaer, American construction worker, friends of the discoverer Mallory Vale || 
|-id=152
| 175152 Marthafarkas ||  || Martha Farkas (born 1959) is one of Canada's most experienced amateur astronomers. || 
|-id=166
| 175166 Adirondack ||  || The Adirondack Astronomy Retreat was designed to inspire observers to return to their astronomical roots. Since its inception in 2004, this retreat allowed many dark-sky enthusiasts to enjoy, share, and bond under some of the best observing conditions in the northeastern portion of North America. || 
|}

175201–175300 

|-id=204
| 175204 Gregbyrne ||  || Greg Byrne (born 1955) is a space physicist. He began his NASA career training astronauts for Space Shuttle flights, served as the chief of Astromaterials Research & Exploration Science at Johnson Space Center; and the NASA chair professor of space systems at the Naval Postgraduate School. || 
|-id=208
| 175208 Vorbourg ||  || The "Vorbourg", is a castle ruin from the 12th century, located near Delémont, Switzerland || 
|-id=238
| 175238 Nguyenhien ||  || Hien Nguyen (born 1968) is a systems engineer at the Johns Hopkins University Applied Physics Laboratory. He served as the Senior Ground Systems Hardware Engineer for the New Horizons Mission to Pluto. || 
|-id=259
| 175259 Offenberger ||  || Allan Offenberger (born 1938), Canadian physicist, professor emeritus at the University of Alberta, and thesis advisor of the discoverer Bernard Christophe || 
|-id=281
| 175281 Kolonics ||  || György Kolonics (1972–2008), a Hungarian canoeist || 
|-id=282
| 175282 Benhida || 2005 LA || Abdelmjid Benhida (born 1963) is an astrophysics researcher in Cadi Ayyad University's department of physics in Marrakech || 
|}

175301–175400 

|-id=365
| 175365 Carsac ||  || François Bordes (1919–1981), also known  by the pen name of Francis Carsac, was a French science-fiction author geologist and archaeologist || 
|}

175401–175500 

|-id=410
| 175410 Tsayweanshun ||  || Tsay Wean-Shun, pioneer in optical astronomy who worked at the Lulin Observatory in Taiwan || 
|-id=411
| 175411 Yilan ||  || Yilan, a county in northeastern Taiwan. || 
|-id=419
| 175419 Albiesachs ||  || Albie Sachs (born 1935), Judge to the Constitutional Court of South Africa. || 
|-id=437
| 175437 Zsivótzky ||  || Gyula Zsivótzky (1937–2007) was a Hungarian hammer thrower. Olympic champion in 1968, silver medalist in 1960 and 1964, and winner of the Summer Universiade in 1965, Zsivótzky set two world records, and he was elected as Hungarian Sportsman of the Year in 1965 and 1968. Name suggested by Z. Kolláth. || 
|-id=450
| 175450 Phillipklu ||  || Phillip K. Lu (born 1932), a Chinese-born astronomer, translator and poet || 
|-id=451
| 175451 Linchisheng ||  || Lin Qisheng (born 1964) is a Taiwanese amateur astronomer and discoverer of minor planets || 
|-id=452
| 175452 Chenggong ||  || Taipei Municipal ChengGong Senior High School, established in 1922, is one of the best middle schools in Taipei. || 
|-id=476
| 175476 Macheret ||  || Augustin Macheret (born 1938), Swiss professor of law and rector of the University of Fribourg, chairman of the Foundation Robert A. Naef, owner of the discovery site || 
|}

175501–175600 

|-id=548
| 175548 Sudzius ||  || Jokubas Sudzius (born 1946), associate professor at the Astronomical Observatory of Vilnius University || 
|-id=562
| 175562 Ajsingh ||  || Amanjot Singh (born 1988) was an undergraduate student in the Pre-Major in Astronomy Program at the University of Washington, where he conducted research into discovering asteroids using data from the Sloan Digital Sky Survey. || 
|-id=563
| 175563 Amyrose ||  || Amy Rose (born 1987) is an American astronomer who helped discover asteroids as a part of her undergraduate research with the Pre-Major in Astronomy Program at the University of Washington. || 
|-id=566
| 175566 Papplaci ||  || László Papp (nicknamed Laci Papp; 1926–2003), a Hungarian boxer and three-time Olympic gold medalist. || 
|-id=583
| 175583 Pingtung ||  || Pingtung County, the southernmost county in Taiwan. || 
|-id=586
| 175586 Tsou ||  || Tsou tribe, native tribe in Taiwan || 
|-id=588
| 175588 Kathrynsmith ||  || Kathryn G. Smith (born 1988), an American astronomer and geologist || 
|}

175601–175700 

|-id=613
| 175613 Shikoku-karst ||  || Shikoku Karst, a karst plateau located at the border of Ehime and Kochi prefectures, Japan || 
|-id=625
| 175625 Canaryastroinst ||  || The Instituto de Astrofísica de Canarias, an astrophysical research institute located in the Canary Islands, Spain. It was founded in 1975. || 
|-id=629
| 175629 Lambertini ||  || Giovanni Lambertini (1916–1997), an Italian friar and science enthusiast, one of the founders of the group of amateur astronomers in Ravenna, Italy, and mentor of two of the discoverers || 
|-id=633
| 175633 Yaoan ||  || Yaoan, county in the north of Yunnan Province, China, where the Yaoan Observation Station  of the Purple Mountain Observatory (which discovered this minor planet) has been built. || 
|-id=636
| 175636 Zvyagel ||  || Zvyagel, ancient name of Novohrad-Volynskyi, Ukraine, birthplace of Larysa Petrivna Kosach, a.k.a. Lesya Ukrainka, 19th–20th-century poet and writer, on the occasion of the 750th anniversary of Zvyagel in 2007 || 
|}

175701–175800 

|-id=718
| 175718 Wuzhengyi ||  || Wu Zhengyi (1916–2013), botanist-academician of the Chinese Academy of Sciences || 
|-id=726
| 175726 Borda ||  || Jean-Charles, chevalier de Borda (1733–1799), a French scientist and sailor || 
|-id=730
| 175730 Gramastetten ||  || Nestled in the beautiful landscape of Muehlviertel (Upper Austria), Gramastetten is a resort for relaxing and for pleasure trips. Gramastetten is the site of an observatory outpost of the Linz public observatory. || 
|}

175801–175900 

|-bgcolor=#f2f2f2
| colspan=4 align=center | 
|}

175901–176000 

|-id=920
| 175920 Francisnimmo ||  || Francis Nimmo (born 1971), a professor at the University of California at Santa Cruz, who served as a Science Team Collaborator for the interior geophysics investigation for the New Horizons mission to Pluto || 
|}

References 

175001-176000